Mount Hamilton is a mountain in the Diablo Range in Santa Clara County, California. The asteroid 452 Hamiltonia, discovered in 1899, is named after the mountain. Golden eagle nesting sites are found on the slopes of Mount Hamilton. On clear days, Mount Tamalpais, the Santa Cruz Mountains, Monterey Bay, the Monterey Peninsula, and even Yosemite National Park are visible from the summit of the mountain.

History

On August 26, 1861, while working for Josiah D. Whitney on the first California Geological Survey, William H. Brewer invited local San Jose preacher (and Brewer's personal friend) Laurentine Hamilton to join his company on a trek to a nearby summit.  Nearing completion of their journey, Hamilton, in good humor, bounded for the summit ahead of the rest of the men and claimed his stake.  In fact, Brewer suggested the mountain be named after Hamilton, only after Whitney declined to have the mountain named after him (a different mountain was later named Mount Whitney).

The Spanish name for Mt. Hamilton was the Sierra de Santa Isabel and the highest point was originally known as Mount Isabel instead of Mount Hamilton. William Henry Brewer and his fellow geologist, Charles F. Hoffmann, did not know it already had a name, and named it Mt. Hamilton, although they did place Isabel Valley on their map to the east. The "Hotel Santa Ysabel" was built on the road up the mountain in 1885 on Smith Creek. When in 1895, the USGS realized that the peak two miles southeast of Mt. Hamilton was as tall, they named it Mt. Isabel.

Climate 

These mountains are high enough to receive snowfall in the winter, perhaps up to a dozen times. Occasionally, when a cold, wet storm comes in from the Gulf of Alaska or Canada, Mt. Hamilton and the surrounding peaks get significant snowfall. In February 2001,  of snow fell, and in March 2006, the peak was left with over a foot (30 cm) of snow in one night.

The National Weather Service has had a cooperative weather station on the summit of Mount Hamilton almost since the time that the Lick Observatory opened.  It has provided a glimpse of the extreme weather conditions that occur on the Diablo Range, especially in the winter months.

Due to frequent thermal inversions during the summer, it is often warmer on Mount Hamilton than in San Jose.

Annual precipitation averages . Measurable precipitation occurs on an average of 78.2 days each year.

Annual snowfall averages . The 24-hour maximum snowfall of  occurred on April 10, 1965. Measurable snow has been recorded in every month from October through May.

Geography

Copernicus Peak
Mount Hamilton is one summit along a mile-long ridge. Other than Hamilton, peaks along the ridge have astronomical names, such as Kepler. The highest peak on the ridge is Copernicus Peak, with elevation .

Mount Hamilton Road 

The sinuous  Mt. Hamilton Road (part of State Route 130) is commonly used by bicyclists and motorcyclists. Built in 1875–76 in anticipation of the observatory, and the need to carry materials and equipment up the mountain in horse-drawn wagons, the grade seldom exceeds 6.5 percent. On a clear day at the summit it is possible to see the Sierra Nevada.

Cyclists commonly use the road because of the long but not overly challenging nature of the climb, sparse vehicular traffic over most of its length, and the views of San Jose and the Santa Clara Valley below.  There is an annual cycling challenge climb in April.
Thanksgiving consistently draws hundreds of cyclists and is frequently the final climb in the annual Low-Key Hillclimb Series
which attracts some of the region's best climbers.

The upward trek is interrupted by two descents, first into Grant Ranch County Park, and again to cross Smith Creek. Quimby Road offers a shorter way from San Jose to Grant Ranch, but is considerably steeper. The main observatory building offers free 15-minute guided tours of the Great Lick refracting telescope.

Geology and hydrology 
Much of the foothill slopes of Mount Hamilton is underlain by Miocene age sandstone of the Briones formation: this bedrock is locally soft and weathered in the upper few feet, but grades locally to very hard at depth. The Babb Creek drainage comprises some of the watershed draining the slopes of Mount Hamilton. The Calaveras and Hayward active earthquake faults traverse the slopes of Mount Hamilton.

Ecology and conservation

Several rare species can be seen on Mount Hamilton. The Mount Hamilton jewelflower (Streptanthus callistus) is endemic to the area. In June 2011, five juvenile California condors flew over Mt. Hamilton and landed on the Lick Observatory, the species' first sighting in the area in at least 30 years.

In 1978, California Department of Fish and Game warden Henry Coletto urged the department to choose the Mount Hamilton area as one of California's relocation sites under a new statewide effort to restore tule elk (Cervus canadensis ssp. nannodes).

The Nature Conservancy "Mount Hamilton Project" has acquired or put under conservation easement  of land towards its  goal for habitat conservation within a  area encompassing much of eastern Santa Clara County.

The community 
Mount Hamilton has its own zip code, 95140. It is generally open space with a population in 2000 of 35. Mount Hamilton Elementary was a small one classroom school that closed in 2006.

See also
 List of highest points in California by county
 List of summits of the San Francisco Bay Area
 Grant Ranch Park

References

External links

 
 
 
 
 Silicon Valley Land Conservancy 

Diablo Range
Mountains of Santa Clara County, California
Mountains of the San Francisco Bay Area
Mountains of Northern California
Lick Observatory